Chaker Alhadhur (born 4 December 1991) is a professional footballer who plays as a left-back or left midfielder for club Ajaccio. Born in France, he represents the Comoros national team.

Club career
Alhadhur made his professional debut for his hometown club Nantes during the 2010–11 season. On 2 December 2011, he signed on loan with Championnat National side Aviron Bayonnais until the end of the season, after a proposed loan to Épinal fell through for financial reasons.

In December 2018, Alhadhur left Caen to sign a contract with Châteauroux in January 2019. On 12 October 2021, he signed for Ajaccio.

International career
Alhadhur debuted with the Comoros national team on 5 March 2014.

In 2022, he was in the Comoros squad which reached the knockout stages of the delayed 2021 Africa Cup of Nations. He played as a goalkeeper in a Round of 16 match against hosts Cameroon after the Comoros were left with no fit goalkeepers due to a combination of injuries and positive COVID-19 tests.

Career statistics

International
Scores and results list Comoros goal tally first, score column indicates score after each Alhadhur goal.

References

External links
 

1991 births
Living people
Footballers from Nantes
French sportspeople of Comorian descent
Citizens of Comoros through descent
French footballers
Association football defenders
Comorian footballers
Comoros international footballers
Stade Malherbe Caen players
FC Nantes players
Aviron Bayonnais FC players
LB Châteauroux players
AC Ajaccio players
Ligue 1 players
Ligue 2 players
Comorian expatriate footballers
Expatriate footballers in France
Black French sportspeople
2021 Africa Cup of Nations players